Abdur Rahman Fakir is a Bangladesh Jamaat-e-Islami politician and the former Member of Parliament of Bogra-6.

Career
Fakir was elected to parliament from Bogra-6 as a Bangladesh Jamaat-e-Islami candidate in 1986.

References

Bangladesh Jamaat-e-Islami politicians
Living people
3rd Jatiya Sangsad members
Year of birth missing (living people)